The most famous league derbies in Bavarian football are the games between FC Bayern Munich and 1. FC Nürnberg, with the Bayern versus TSV 1860 Munich matchups coming a close second. Traditionally, 1. FC Nürnberg versus SpVgg Fürth is also of historical significance as, especially during the 1920s, those two clubs were dominant forces in German football. A distant fourth comes the Augsburg derby, at times played on highest level in the past, too.

In comparison, all other league derbies in Bavaria took mostly place on state level. Occasionally however, clubs from the same city would still meet in the 2. Bundesliga, like the Würzburg or Ingolstadt derby, which each was played for a season there. With the re-establishment of the Regionalligas in 1994, Bavarian league derbies above the Oberliga level became more common, now also involving reserve sides like FC Bayern Munich II and TSV 1860 Munich II. The latter has grown in importance and attraction in recent years, with spectator figures in excess of 10,000 and live broadcasts in television.

This list includes every derby played in Bavaria on league level above the Bayernliga, which was the highest state league from 1945, when the Oberliga Süd was established, until 2012, when the Regionalliga Bayern was established.

Leagues
Bavarian derbies listed here were and are played in the following leagues:
 Bundesliga (I) from 1963
 Oberliga Süd (I) 1945 to 1963
 2. Oberliga Süd (II) 1950 to 1963
 Regionalliga Süd (II) 1963 to 1974
 2. Bundesliga Süd (II) 1974 to 1981
 2. Bundesliga (II) from 1981
 3. Liga (III) from 2008
 Regionalliga Süd (III-IV) 1994 to 2012
 Regionalliga Bayern (IV) from 2012

Below these leagues, as the highest level of play in the state of Bavaria until 2012, sat the Bayernliga. This league was formed in 1945 and went through a number of name changes during its existence. Since 2012 the Regionalliga Bayern is the highest football league in the state.

Regional

The Bavarian derby
Bayern Munich vs. Nürnberg is considered the biggest game in Bavaria, between the two most successful and popular clubs in the state (29 German titles for Bayern and 9 for Nürnberg). It is commonly called the Bavarian derby (German: Bayerische Derby). In German media it is mostly called the Fränkisch-Bayerisches Derby (translated as the Franconian-Old Bavarian derby), as Nuremberg fans consider themselves and their club as non-Bavarian.

The games between the two clubs since the end of the Second World War:

Overall match statistics

The Franconian derby
1. FC Nürnberg vs. SpVgg Greuther Fürth is not a true city derby by name, because in 1922 Fürth's population opted against their city council's proposal for a merger with Nuremberg. The game is the oldest top-level derby in Bavaria and the most-played football contest in Germany with over 264 games between the two sides. It is commonly called the Franconian derby (German:Frankenderby).

1. FC Nuremberg versus SpVgg Fürth
The games between the two clubs since the end of the Second World War:

1. FC Nürnberg versus SpVgg Greuther Fürth
After the merger of SpVgg Fürth and TSV Vestenbergsgreuth, the new club adopted a somewhat combined name but the game against 1. FC Nürnberg is still considered a continuation of the old derby.

Overall match statistics

1. FC Nürnberg II versus SpVgg Greuther Fürth II
With both reserve sides achieving Bayernliga qualification in 2001 for the first time, the "little" Franconian derby will be played at this level for the first time in the 2001–02 season:

Augsburg-1860 Munich rivalry

 
FC Augsburg and TSV 1860 München share a fierce rivalry.

Augsburg-Ingolstadt derby
FC Augsburg and FC Ingolstadt are considered fierce local rivals

Danube river derby

The Donau derby, named after the Danube river is played between FC Ingolstadt 04 and Jahn Regensburg

Local

The Munich derby

This is the biggest game in Munich, between the Bavarian capital's two most dominant and successful clubs. It is commonly called the Munich derby (German:Münchner Stadtderby).

FC Bayern Munich versus TSV 1860 Munich

The games between the two clubs since the end of the Second World War:

FC Bayern Munich II versus TSV 1860 Munich II
The games of the reserve sides of the two clubs:

The Augsburg derby

By far the biggest derby in the city of Augsburg was the BCA versus Schwaben game.

 Schwaben and BCA merged in 1969 to form FC Augsburg but Schwaben soon established itself as an independent club again and the derbies between them and FCA are seen as a continuation of the games versus BCA. These new derbies however have taken place in the Oberliga Bayern only.

The Fürth derby
This derby has little historic background and was only played on higher level for one season. Usually, the two clubs played in tiers far apart, only from 1988 to 1991 did both clubs previously meet in the Landesliga Bayern-Mitte.

Source:

The Ingolstadt derby
This derby was played as high up as the 2. Bundesliga but more common in the Oberliga and Landesliga Bayern-Süd. It came to an end in 2004, when both clubs merged to form FC Ingolstadt 04.

Source:

The other Munich derbies
Munich, being the Bavarian capital, always had many clubs at Oberliga level and above and therefore derbies in this city were plentiful.

FC Bayern Munich versus FC Bayern Munich II
A very unusual derby was played in the DFB-Pokal in 1976, when Bayern Munich's first team met its reserve side:

FC Bayern Munich versus SpVgg Unterhaching
Unterhaching, being a relatively new club in professional football, did not play the FC Bayern until very recently.

Source:

FC Bayern Munich versus FC Wacker München
This derby has a long tradition but due to the steep decline of the FC Wacker has not been played for a long time.

Source:

TSV 1860 Munich versus SpVgg Unterhaching
Unterhaching and the TSV 1860 first met in the Oberliga Bayern in 1982 and played most of their derbies in this league, only meeting on professional level for the first time in 1999.

Source:

TSV 1860 Munich versus FC Wacker München
This derby has a long tradition but due to the steep decline of the FC Wacker has not been played in recent seasons. The two clubs also met frequently in the Oberliga, last in 1989.

Source:

FC Bayern Munich II versus SpVgg Unterhaching

Source:

TSV 1860 Munich II versus SpVgg Unterhaching

Source:

The Würzburg derby
The Würzburg derby between FV Würzburg 04 and Würzburger Kickers, first played in 1908, was held as high as the 2. Bundesliga but came temporarily to a halt when the FV folded in 1981. The club reformed and the derby has since been played mostly on Landesliga Bayern-Nord level but also in the Bayernliga in recent years.

See also
 Local derby

References

External links
 Bayrischer Fussball Bund (Bavarian FA) 
 Bavarian League tables and results 
 Das deutsche Fussball Archiv 
 Weltfussball.de - Tables and results from the first to the fifth division 

Football in Bavaria
Association football rivalries in Germany